Private Nathaniel McClean Gwynne (July 5, 1849 - January 6, 1883) was an American soldier who fought in the American Civil War. Gwynee received his country's highest award for bravery during combat, the Medal of Honor. Gwynne's medal was won for his actions during the Battle of the Crater, part of the Siege of Petersburg. He was honored with the award on January 27, 1865.

Gwynee was from Urbana, Ohio, and entered service in Fairmount, Missouri.

Medal of Honor citation

See also
List of American Civil War Medal of Honor recipients: G–L

References

1849 births
1883 deaths
19th-century American people
American amputees
American Civil War recipients of the Medal of Honor
People of Ohio in the American Civil War
People from Urbana, Ohio
Union Army soldiers
United States Army Medal of Honor recipients